The 2022 Liga de Elite is the 50th season of the Liga de Elite, the top Macanese league for association football clubs since its establishment in 1973. The season began on 14 January 2022 without Polícia, in which they withdrew from the league to focus on the COVID-19 pandemic in Macau. Most games take place at the 2,000-capacity Lin Fong Sports Centre.

Champions

League table

Results

Top scorers

See also
2022 Taça de Macau

References

External links
Macau Football Association

Campeonato da 1ª Divisão do Futebol seasons
Macau
1